Fang is a 2018 horror film written and directed by Adam R. Steigert. The film, which features a werewolf, stars Melodie Roehrig, Theo Maefs, and Melantha Blackthorne. Production for the film began in March 2017.

Plot
After perpetrating a robbery that ended in murder, Chloe and Joe retreat to the home of a distant relative, where they find themselves stalked and hunted by unknown creatures.

Cast

References

External links

2018 films
American werewolf films
2010s English-language films
Films directed by Adam R. Steigert
2010s American films